Thou is a Belgian rock band from Ghent. The band consists of Does de Wolf (vocals, organ), Bart Vincent (vocals, guitar), Pim de Wolf (guitar), Bart Depoortere (bass), Geert De Waegeneer (drums), and Hans Rabaey (arrangement).

History
Thou released its first EP Une Poupee Pour M'amuser in 1997, which was followed by the debut album, Hello in This Sun, in 1998. Amidst of the Portishead comparisons, the band recorded their second studio album and U.S. debut, Put Us in Tune, at Portishead's home studio. The band also used Portishead's unused rhythm tracks for their own songs. The album featured contributions from violinist Richard Hunt, Roni Size bass guitarist Si John, and Belgian musician Mauro Pawlowski, as well as PJ Harvey contributor John Parish.

The band released their third album, Elvis Or Betty Boop in 2001.

Style
The band's style has been described as dreamy, "dramatic pop with post-trip-hop beats" and has been compared to those of Portishead, T. Rex and early Yo La Tengo. Allmusic critic Thom Jurek observed that the band's music touches "everything from trip-hop, cheesy French pop, St. Etienne, and Stereolab." Jurek also noted the influence of "early Prince, Soundgarden and the lilting dainty pop of the Boo Radleys" on the album.

Band members
Does de Wolf – vocals, organ
Bart Vincent – vocals, guitar
Pim de Wolf – guitar
Bart Depoortere – bass
Geert De Waegeneer – drums
Hans Rabaey – arrangement

Discography
Studio albums
 Hello in This Sun (1998)
 Put Us in Tune (2000)
 Elvis or Betty Boop (2002)
 I Like Girls in Russia (2004)

EPs
 Une Poupée Pour M'Amuser (1997)

References

External links
 

Belgian alternative rock groups
Belgian pop music groups
Trip hop groups
Musical groups established in 1997
Dream pop musical groups
Culture of Ghent